David Bedford (1937–2011) was an English composer and musician

David Bedford may also refer to:

* David Bedford (athlete) (born 1949), English long-distance runner
 Dave Bedford (footballer) (1926–2017), Australian footballer